Puccinia erianthi is a plant pathogen.

See also
 List of Puccinia species

References

External links
 Index Fungorum
 USDA ARS Fungal Database

Fungal plant pathogens and diseases
erianthi
Fungi described in 1944